Hatibandha Union is a union of Sakhipur Upazila, Tangail District, Bangladesh. It is situated 29 km east of Tangail, the district headquarters.

Demographics

According to the census of 2011 performed by Bangladesh Bureau of Statistics, the population of Hatibandha union was 34445. There are 8630 households in total.

Education

The literacy rate of Hatibandha Union is 42% (Male-46.2%, Female-38.3%).

See also
 Union Councils of Tangail District

References

Populated places in Dhaka Division
Populated places in Tangail District
Unions of Sakhipur Upazila